The  is a subway line which is part of the Nagoya Municipal Subway system in Nagoya, Japan. It runs between two stations, Kamiiida and Heian-dōri, both in Kita Ward, Nagoya. Both stations have automatic platform gates.
The Kamiiida Line's color on maps is pink. Its stations carry the letter K followed by a number. Officially, the line is called . All the stations accept manaca, a rechargeable contactless smart card. The line is essentially an extension of Meitetsu Komaki Line. As such, the two lines have through services.

After the abolishment of Nagoya Municipal Tramway in the 1970s, Kamiiida Station, the terminus of Meitetsu Komaki Line, lost its connection to other railway lines. Users had to walk to Heian-dōri Station or take a bus. The short, yet long-awaited link line was finally opened in 2003. There is a future plan to extend the line, but the plan is currently suspended.

Stations 

1: The names are tentative.

See also
List of railway lines in Japan

External links 
  Transportation Bureau City of Nagoya official website
  Kami-iida Link Line official website

Nagoya Municipal Subway